Defence Planning Committee may refer to:
 Defence Planning Committee (India)
 Defence Planning Committee (NATO)